Whitefield Township is located in Marshall County, Illinois. As of the 2010 census, its population was 302 and it contained 138 housing units.

Geography

Demographics

References

External links
City-data.com
Illinois State Archives

Townships in Marshall County, Illinois
Peoria metropolitan area, Illinois
Townships in Illinois
1849 establishments in Illinois